Extremist Groups: An International Compilation of Terrorist Organizations, Violent Political Groups, and Issue-Oriented Militant Movements is a reference book compiling information on over 200 groups classified as extremist.

Summary
Contributing editor Richard H. Ward describes it (in the preface) as "part of a broader effort (on the part of the OICJ) to better understand the motivational, psychological, and sociological aspects of those who would attack societies throughout the world." The profile of each group provides (when able): what the group is also known as; when it was formed; its stated aims/ideology/policy; the location of its headquarters; its area of operations; its size; the nature of its structure; names of its leaders (with their position); membership information (either the type of the population recruited from, or the names of prominent members with their record); sources of its funding; its modus operandi/tactics; its publications; its business network contacts; a chronology of its significant actions and activities; a trend assessment; and sources for further reading.

Publication history
The first edition was compiled and analyzed by Jeffrey A. Builta; it was published in 1996 with 1,121 pages. The second edition was compiled by Sean Hill as Senior Researcher and Richard H. Ward as contributing editor, with a foreword by Kathleen Kiernan, Assistant Deputy Director, Bureau of Alcohol, Tobacco and Firearms. It was released in 2002 as a 961-page hardcover and paperback by the Office of International Criminal Justice and the Institute for the Study of Violent Groups at Sam Houston State University. The third edition was published in 2006, a paperback of 456 pages with 145 entries.

External links
Extremist Groups (first edition) reviewed by Daniel Pipes, in Middle East Quarterly (December 1996).

1996 non-fiction books
2002 non-fiction books
2006 non-fiction books
American encyclopedias
Irregular military
Books about terrorism
Specialized encyclopedias